Janosy Hill is a hill rising to  just west of Mirabilite Pond in the Porter Hills, in the Denton Hills of the Scott Coast, Antarctica. It was named after Robert J. Janosy, a geologist with the Byrd Polar Research Center geological field party to the Royal Society Range in 1991–92.

References

Hills of Victoria Land
Scott Coast